The Council of Ancients or Council of Elders was the upper house of the French legislature under the Constitution of the Year III, during the period commonly known as the Directory (French: Directoire), from 22 August 1795 until 9 November 1799, roughly the second half of the period generally referred to as the French Revolution.

The Council of Ancients was the senior of the two-halves of the republican legislative system. The Ancients were 250 members who could accept or reject laws put forward by the lower house of the Directory, the Council of Five Hundred (Conseil des Cinq-Cents). Each member had to be at least forty years of age, and a third of them would be replaced annually. They had no authority to draft laws, but any bills that they renounced could not be reintroduced for at least a year.

Besides functioning as a legislative body, the Ancients chose five Directors, who jointly held executive power, from the list of names put forward by the Council of Five Hundred. The Council of Ancients had their own distinctive official uniform, with robes, cape and hat, just as did the Council of Five Hundred and the Directors. Under the Thermidorean constitution, as Boissy d'Anglas put it, the Council of Five Hundred was to be the imagination of the Republic, and the Council of Ancients its reason.

The name adopted for the body was based on the French translation/adaptation of the term Senate.

Presidents of the Council of Ancients
 28 October 1795: Claude Antoine Rudel Du Miral (due to age)
 28 October 1795 – 2 November 1795: Louis-Marie de La Révellière-Lépeaux
 2 November 1795 – 23 November 1795: Pierre-Charles-Louis Baudin, known as Baudin des Ardennes
 23 November 1795 – 22 December 1795: François Denis Tronchet
 22 December 1795 – 22 January 1796: Théodore Vernier
 22 January 1796 – 20 February 1796: Guillaume François Charles Goupil de Préfelne
 20 February 1796 – 21 March 1796: Claude Ambroise Régnier
 21 March 1796 – 20 April 1796: Jacques Antoine Creuzé-Latouche
 20 April 1796 – 20 May 1796: Jean-Barthélemy Lecouteulx de Canteleu
 20 May 1796 – 19 June 1796: Charles-François Lebrun
 19 June 1796 – 19 July 1796: Jean Étienne Marie Portalis
 19 July 1796 – 18 August 1796: Jean Dussaulx
 18 August 1796 – 23 September 1796: Honoré Muraire
 23 September 1796 – 22 October 1796: Roger Ducos
 22 October 1796 – 21 November 1796: Jean-Girard Lacuée
 21 November 1796 – 21 December 1796: Jean-Jacques Bréard, known as Bréard-Duplessis
 21 December 1796 – 20 January 1797: Boniface Paradis
 20 January 1797 – 19 February 1797: Sébastien Ligeret de Beauvais
 19 February 1797 – 21 March 1797: Joseph Clément Poullain de Grandprey 
 21 March 1797 – 20 April 1797: Jean François Bertrand Delmas
 20 April 1797 – 20 May 1797: Edme-Bonaventure Courtois
 20 May 1797 – 19 June 1797: François Barbé-Marbois
 19 June 1797 – 19 July 1797: Louis Bernard de Saint-Affrique
 19 July 1797 – 18 August 1797: Pierre Samuel Dupont de Nemours
 18 August 1797 – 4 September 1797: André-Daniel Laffon de Ladebat, known as Laffon-Ladébat
 6 September 1797 – 23 September 1797: Jean-Antoine Marbot
 23 September 1797 – 22 October 1797: Emmanuel Crétet
 22 October 1797 – 21 November 1797: Jean-Pierre Lacombe-Saint-Michel
 21 November 1797 – 21 December 1797: Jean François Philibert Rossée
 21 December 1797 – 20 January 1798: Jean-Baptiste Marragon
 20 January 1798 – 19 February 1798: Jean Rousseau
 19 February 1798 – 21 March 1798: Pardoux Bordas
 21 March 1798 – 20 April 1798: Étienne Mollevaut
 20 April 1798 – 20 May 1798: Jacques Poisson de Coudreville
 20 May 1798 – 19 June 1798: Claude Ambroise Régnier
 19 June 1798 – 19 July 1798: Jean-Antoine Marbot
 19 July 1798 – 18 August 1798: Étienne Maynaud Bizefranc de Lavaux
 18 August 1798 – 23 September 1798: Pierre Antoine Laloy
 23 September 1798 – 22 October 1798: Benoît Michel Decomberousse
 22 October 1798 – 21 November 1798: Emmanuel Pérès de Lagesse
 21 November 1798 – 21 December 1798: Jean-Augustin Moreau de Vormes
 21 December 1798 – 20 January 1799: Jean-Baptiste Perrin des Vosges
 20 January 1799 – 19 February 1799: Dominique Joseph Garat
 19 February 1799 – 21 March 1799: Jean-Aimé Delacoste
 21 March 1799 – 20 April 1799: Mathieu Depère
 20 April 1799 – 20 May 1799: Claude-Pierre Dellay d'Agier
 20 May 1799 – 19 June 1799: Charles Claude Christophe Gourdan
 19 June 1799 – 19 July 1799: Pierre-Charles-Louis Baudin, known as Baudin des Ardennes
 19 July 1799 – 18 August 1799: Louis-Thibaut Dubois-Dubais
 18 August 1799 – 24 September 1799: Mathieu-Augustin Cornet
 24 September 1799 – 23 October 1799: Joseph Cornudet des Chaumettes
 23 October 1799 – 10 November 1799: Louis-Nicolas Lemercier

See also
 Senate (France)
 List of presidents of the Senate (France)
 Council of the Republic (France)
 Chamber of Peers (France)

References

Sources
 http://www.rulers.org/frgovt1.html

Defunct upper houses
1795 establishments in France
1799 disestablishments
1795 events of the French Revolution
1796 events of the French Revolution
1797 events of the French Revolution
1798 events of the French Revolution
1799 events of the French Revolution
French Directory
Historical legislatures in France